Q27 may refer to:
 Q27 (New York City bus)
 An-Naml, the 27th surah of the Quran
 , a Naïade-class submarine
 London Underground Q27 Stock